The Nordic Council Environment Prize (also known as the Nordic Council Nature and Environment Prize) is awarded each year to a Nordic company, organization, or individual to recognize "exemplary efforts to integrate respect for the environment into their business or work or for some other form of extraordinary initiative on behalf of the environment". The nominees and winner are chosen by a 13-person committee consisting of two representatives each from Denmark, Norway, Sweden, Finland, and Iceland, as well as one each from the Faroe Islands, Greenland, and Åland. The first prize was awarded in 1995. Since 2005, the committee has chosen a theme each year for the nominations and award.

Prize recipients

See also

 List of environmental awards

References 

Nordic Council prizes
Environmental awards
Awards established in 1995